Romualdów  is a village in the administrative district of Gmina Wieniawa, within Przysucha County, Masovian Voivodeship, in east-central Poland.

Romualdów was the location of a motte-and-bailey castle from the 13th-14th century, which is now an archaeological site.

References

Villages in Przysucha County
Archaeological sites in Poland